Playin' Up a Storm is the second studio album by the Gregg Allman Band, released in 1977 on Capricorn Records. It peaked at number 42 on the Billboard 200.

Background
Playin' Up a Storm was Allman's second solo studio effort, following 1973's Laid Back. It came after the breakup of the Allman Brothers Band in 1976. During this time, Allman had moved to Hollywood to live with his then-wife Cher. The album was produced by Lenny Waronker, and in his memoir, My Cross to Bear, Allman remembered that Waronker was frustrated with his unpunctuality in regards to studio time. The album was released in May 1977, on Capricorn Records. Allman claimed that Phil Walden, owner of Capricorn, was incensed over his move to the West Coast to live with Cher, and only printed 50,000 copies of the LP.

Critical reception
The Rolling Stone Album Guide called the album a "harder-hitting" followup, writing that it "actually eclipsed most of the Allmans' work of the same period."

Track listing

Side one
"Come and Go Blues" (Gregg Allman) – 4:48
"Let This Be a Lesson to Ya'" (Gregg Allman, Malcolm Rebennack) – 3:42
"Brightest Smile in Town" (Ray Charles, Barry De Vorzon, Bob Sherman) – 3:06
"Bring It on Back" (Gregg Allman) – 4:49

Side two
"Cryin' Shame" (Steve Beckmeier, Steve Berlin) –  3:44
"Sweet Feelin'" (Clarence Carter, Marcus Daniel, Rick Hall, Candi Staton) – 3:37
"It Ain't No Use" (Bernie Baum, Bill Giant, Florence Kaye) – 3:54
"Matthew's Arrival" (Neil Larsen) – 3:50
"One More Try" (Gregg Allman) – 3:53

Personnel

The Gregg Allman Band
Gregg Allman – vocals, organ, piano, Fender Rhodes, acoustic guitar
Steve Beckmeier – guitar
Ricky Hirsch – guitar, slide guitar
John Leslie Hug – guitar
Willie Weeks – bass 
Neil Larsen – synthesizer, piano, keyboards, Fender Rhodes, horn arrangements
Bill Stewart – drums

Additional musicians
Fred Beckmeier – bass
Red Callender – bass
Dr. John – piano, clavinet
Victor Feldman – percussion
Venetta Fields – background vocals
Clydie King – background vocals
Milt Holland – percussion
David Luell – horn, saxophone
Steve Madaio – horn
Pat Rizzo – horn
Sherlie Matthews – background vocals
Bill Payne – synthesizer, keyboards
Nick DeCaro - string and horn arrangements, conductor
Marty Paich - string and horn arrangement, conductor on "Brightest Smile in Town"
Harry Bluestone, Sid Sharp - concertmaster

Technical
Noel Newbolt, Sue Haverback, Tori Hammond - production assistance
Diana Marie Kaylan - art direction
David Alexander - photography

References

1977 albums
Gregg Allman albums
Albums arranged by Marty Paich
Albums produced by Lenny Waronker
Albums produced by Russ Titelman
Capricorn Records albums